Kalanjiam Community Radio is a radio broadcasting service in Tamil, operating from Vizhunthamavadi, a tiny village in the coastal area of Tamil Nadu, India. It broadcasts in the FM broadcast band on 90.8 MHz from local time (GMT+5) 9.00 a.m. until 5.00 p.m.

Organisation
Kalanjiam Community Radio is a unit of Kalanjiam Media Centre supported by DHAN Foundation as part of its development program in the Tsunami affected areas in Southern India. The United Nations Development Programme (UNDP) provided the resources and a Bengaluru-based organisation, VOICES provides necessary technical support.

Vision
The vision of Kalanjiam Media Centre, as stated by the organisation, is:

As per the above, the station broadcasts program material created/produced from contributions by the local community and presented by a team of trained volunteers from the same community.
The programming focuses on local information pertaining to community needs concerned with disaster preparedness, livelihoods, local best practices, women and children, health, education and farming.

References

Radio stations in Tamil Nadu
Community radio stations in India
Tamil-language radio stations
Radio stations established in 2006